The Framework Convention for the Protection of National Minorities (FCNM) is a multilateral treaty of the Council of Europe aimed at protecting the rights of minorities. It came into effect in 1998 and by 2009 it had been ratified by 39 member states.

History
The Council of Europe first discussed according specific protection for national minorities in 1949, but it was not until 1990 that the Council of Europe made a firm commitment to protect these minority groups. Recommendation 1134 (1990) contained a list of principles which the Assembly considered necessary for this purpose. The Parliamentary Assembly did in the beginning call for adoption of a protocol to the ECHR. The Framework was signed in February 1995 by 22 member States of the Council of Europe and became active in 1998. By mid-2005, 43 member states had signed and 39 ratified it.

Aims and criticism
The broad aims of the convention are to ensure that the signatory states respect the rights of national minorities, undertaking to combat discrimination, promote equality, preserve and develop the culture and identity of national minorities, guarantee certain freedoms in relation to access to the media, minority languages and education and encourage the participation of national minorities in public life. Article 25 of the Framework Convention binds the member states to submit a report to the Council of Europe containing "full information on the legislative and other measures taken to give effect to the principles set out in this framework Convention" (Council of Europe, 1994, 7).

The convention has come under some criticism. First of all, not all member states of the Council of Europe have signed and ratified it. France and Turkey have done neither. Iceland, Belgium, Luxembourg and Greece have signed and have yet to ratify. Also, the provisions offer little new on already existing international treaties. Furthermore, they are hedged around with many phrases including "as far as possible" (Art 10.2). The convention does not define "national minority" and several countries set their own definition of the term when they ratified the treaty. For example, the United Kingdom ratified the convention on the understanding that it would be applied with reference to "racial groups" within the meaning of Section 3(1) of the Race Relations Act 1976. Since this excluded the Cornish people, this resulted in pressure, including from Cornwall Council, for the UK Government to recognise the Cornish as a national minority. In April 2014, it was announced by the Chief Secretary to the Treasury, Danny Alexander, that the UK Government would recognise the Cornish as a national minority under the FCNM.

Overall however, Phillips (2002) [?] has argued that because the FCNM is flexible it has allowed such a great number of states to ratify it so quickly. Therefore, it should not be considered a failure, but a start. Many authors agree with this arguing that it needs to be implemented in 'good faith' with the political will to support commitment to minority rights.

See also
 European Charter for Regional or Minority Languages
 Languages of the European Union
 Sub-Commission on Prevention of Discrimination and Protection of Minorities
 List of Linguistic Rights in Constitutions (Europe)
 Stateless nation
 International human rights instruments

References

External links

Data on Conventions on Council of Europe portal
Secretariat of the Framework Convention
State and NGO reports under FCNM
Eurominority map of minorities, native peoples and ethnic groups
  European languages
European Centre for Minority Issues
The Rights of Minorities in Europe 2008 – A Commentary on the European Framework Convention for the Protection of National Minorities by Marc Weller
Recommendations from NGOs for increasing the effectiveness and expanding the ratification of the FCNM 2008
The re-politicization of minority protection: six cases from the FCNM monitoring process, ECMI Study #7 (2012) by Tove H. Malloy

Council of Europe treaties
Politics of Europe
Ethnic minorities
Minority rights
Treaties concluded in 1995
Treaties entered into force in 1998
Treaties of Albania
Treaties of Armenia
Treaties of Austria
Treaties of Azerbaijan
Treaties of Bosnia and Herzegovina
Treaties of Bulgaria
Treaties of Croatia
Treaties of Cyprus
Treaties of the Czech Republic
Treaties of Denmark
Treaties of Estonia
Treaties of Finland
Treaties of Georgia (country)
Treaties of Germany
Treaties of Hungary
Treaties of Ireland
Treaties of Italy
Treaties of Latvia
Treaties of Liechtenstein
Treaties of Lithuania
Treaties of Malta
Treaties of Moldova
Treaties of Montenegro
Treaties of the Netherlands
Treaties of Norway
Treaties of Poland
Treaties of Portugal
Treaties of Romania
Treaties of Russia
Treaties of San Marino
Treaties of Serbia and Montenegro
Treaties of Slovakia
Treaties of Slovenia
Treaties of Spain
Treaties of Sweden
Treaties of Switzerland
Treaties of North Macedonia
Treaties of Ukraine
Treaties of the United Kingdom
1995 in France
Treaties extended to Greenland
Treaties extended to the Faroe Islands